A Day of Nights is the only studio album by American post-metal band Battle of Mice. It was released on October 6, 2006 through Neurot Recordings label.

According to singer Julie Christmas, the album is "written in a timeline that mirrors what was happening between Josh [Graham] and me in our growing, and then rapidly decaying, relationship."

Background 
Battle of Mice formed in 2005 when vocalist Julie Christmas' band Made Out of Babies played South by Southwest with guitarist Josh Graham's band Red Sparowes. The two "hated each other immediately", according to Christmas, but when they toured the West Coast together, a "long-distance relationship ensued, the furious and occasionally harrowing nature of which is reflected in the music of Battle of Mice," with Graham in Los Angeles and Christmas in New York. The band then added Pere Ubu's Tony Maimone on bass and The Book of Knots' Joel Hamilton on guitar.

The album's track ordering chronicles the disintegration of Christmas and Graham's relationship. The band finished tracking five of the album's seven songs before the toxicity between Christmas and Graham created a working environment that was too uncomfortable for Maimone to continue in. By that point, the pair refused to be in the same room as each other, leading the guitars and the vocals to be completed on separate days. Christmas' vocals were recorded in one take without pre-written lyrics.

The song "At the Base of the Giant's Throat" contains a 911 call that Christmas states took one take to make. "I am actually not allowed to talk about that," she said. Before the album's closing song "Cave of Spleen" was recorded, a band member was reported to have "accidentally" fallen down a staircase.

Track listing

Personnel 
 Julie Christmas (Made Out of Babies) – vocals
 Josh Graham (ex-Neurosis, ex-Red Sparowes, A Storm of Light) – guitars, keyboards, and vocals
 Joel Hamilton (The Book of Knots) – guitar
 Tony Maimone (The Book of Knots, Pere Ubu) – bass
 Joe Tomino (Fugees, Dub Trio, Peeping Tom) – drums

References 

Battle of Mice albums
2006 debut albums